Pakistan Medical and Dental Council is a statutory regulatory authority that maintains the official register of medical practitioners in Pakistan. Its chief function is to establish uniform minimum standards of basic and higher qualifications in medicine and dentistry throughout Pakistan. It also sets the education standards for medical colleges in Pakistan along with the Higher Education Commission.'History
The Pakistan Medical Council was initially established in 1948 by adopting the British Indian Medical Council Act 1933 on the recommendations of the 1947 Pakistan Health Conference. It was later reorganized under the Pakistan Medical Council Act 1951 whereby each province has its own medical council. In 1957, the West Pakistan Medical Council was formed by merging the Sindh Medical Council and the Punjab Medical Council. The Pakistan Medical Council Ordinance 1962 established the present-day Pakistan Medical and Dental Council as a statutory body in 1962 and all provincial councils were dissolved. Three amendments were passed thereafter as the Medical and Dental Council (Amendment) Act in 1973, 1999 and 2012. In 2019, President Arif Alvi passed a Law and dissolved the Pakistan Medical and Dental Council (PM&DC) to create a new council named as Pakistan Medical Council (PMC). However after 3 years in 2022, The Islamabad High Court restored the Pakistan Medical and Dental Council (PM&DC) and declared the formation of Pakistan Medical Commission (PMC) – a body formed through a presidential ordinance in its place – as illegal.

Registration
All medical and dental practitioners and students are required to register with the commission to legally practice medicine and dentistry in Pakistan. The guidelines for registration are outlined under Chapter IX, Pakistan Registration of Medical and Dental Practitioners Regulations, 2008.

Criticism
Several corruption allegations and scandals have been associated with the previous council (PMC). In particular, irregularities in the registration of medical and dental colleges and allegations of wrongdoing in the accreditation of doctors have also been leveled in judicial probes of the council's affairs. A judicial commission was set up under a court order after allegations of embezzlement in the registration of private medical and dental colleges surfaced in 2013. The commission was headed by the former Lahore High Court judge Shabbar Raza Rizvi.

Representatives of various medical organizations have expressed their concerns regarding PMC that it will give autonomy to private medical colleges for fixing their fees, thus increasing the burden on students.

Dissolution and restoration
In October 2019, the PMDC was dissolved and replaced by the Pakistan Medical Commission (PMC) following President Arif Alvi's signing of the Pakistan Medical Commission Ordinance 2019''. The move was done in order to regulate and control the medical profession in Pakistan by establishing uniform minimum standards of medical education, training, and recognition of qualifications in medicine and dentistry. For this to occur, it was argued that PMDC had to be dissolved first in order to properly implement the new ordinance. PMDC offices were temporarily sealed to ensure the protection of essential records and assets. The new PMC would consist of the existing Medical and Dental Council, the National Medical and Dental Academic Board, and the National Medical Authority, which would act as a Secretariat of the Commission.

On 11 February 2020, the Islamabad High Court nullified the Pakistan Medical Commission Ordinance and restored PMDC.

On 16 September 2020, PMDC was dissolved again by a joint session of the Senate and Parliament by passing the bill to replace PMDC with PMC to ensure standard medical education in Pakistan.

On 23 August 2022, The Senate Standing Committee on Health on Tuesday approved the Pakistan Medical and Dental Council Amendment Bill, 2022, with a majority vote, after which the legal status of the PMC has ceased to exist.

On 12th January 2023, The President of Pakistan gave final approval to the PMDC Bill 2022 after which the Pakistan Medical and Dental Council have been established.

See also
 List of medical colleges in Pakistan
 College of Physicians and Surgeons Pakistan

References

External links

PMDC license registration and renewal

Professional associations based in Pakistan
Medical and health organisations based in Pakistan
1962 establishments in Pakistan
Medical regulation in Pakistan
Government agencies established in 1962
Medical and health regulators
Organizations established in 1962
Regulatory authorities of Pakistan